Tow Mater, or simply Mater, is a fictional character in the Cars media franchise produced by Pixar. Mater debuted as a major character in the film Cars as the local tow truck in Radiator Springs, eventually becoming the best friend of series protagonist Lightning McQueen. Following his initial appearance, Mater has become the secondary protagonist throughout the franchise and is generally seen as the series' breakout character, most apparent in his role as the main protagonist in Cars Toons: Mater's Tall Tales and Cars 2. He is voiced by Larry the Cable Guy and visually inspired by a 1956–57 International Harvester tow truck and 1955-1957 Chevrolet Task Force.

Background
Mater's design is based on a 1955-57 Chevrolet Task Force Tow truck  once used to lift equipment from mine shafts in Cherokee County, Kansas. A Cars "Rev'd Up" DVD released as a 2006 bonus in Target stores describes Mater as inspired by a 1957 Dodge truck.

Mater's driving skills include a claim to be "the world's best backwards driver," an ability inspired by Dean Walker, a Kansas Historic Route 66 Association president known in Riverton as "Crazy Legs Walker, the Ambassador of Crazy Feet on Route 66" for his ability to twist his feet backward and walk in reverse.

Mater takes his nickname from construction superintendent and die-hard NASCAR fan Douglas "Mater" Keever, who provides the voice of one of the RV's watching the big race ("Well dip me in axle grease and call me slick!").

Mater's final personality was based on his voice actor, Larry the Cable Guy, and he uses many of Larry's catchphrases, including "Git-R-Done" during the final race sequence and "I don't care who you are; that's funny right there" during the tractor tipping scene.

Characterization

Mater's color was originally baby blue as shown in a flashback when he was young; however, over the years he has rusted into a patchwork light brown/orange color with some of the blue still showing through. He is missing his hood and his left headlight. His license plate number is A113, the classroom number used by character animation students at the California Institute of the Arts. Mater is capable of racing, as well as being the (self-proclaimed) world's best backwards driver. He attributes his skill to his rearview mirrors and his own philosophy: "Don't need to know where I'm going, just need to know where I've been."

In Cars 2, Mater displays a vast encyclopedic savant like knowledge of automotive parts and engines. He correctly answers a code question concerning the Volkswagen Karmann Ghia asked by British intelligence agent Holley Shiftwell, leading her to mistake him for an American agent she is supposed to meet. Later, when Shiftwell and her partner Finn McMissile show Mater a photograph of a mystery car's engine, he identifies it on sight and points out the spare parts being used to keep it running. His knowledge on car mechanics helps McMissile and Shiftwell apprehend Sir Miles Axlerod.

In Cars 3, Mater is a supporting character who encourages Lightning in his attempt to continue racing in the Piston Cup against Jackson Storm and the nextgens. He chooses to stay with the other cars in Radiator Springs while Lightning heads off to the Rust-eze Training Center, and gives Lightning the idea to contact Smokey during a video call with him later in the film.

Appearances

Cars 

Mater owns, operates, and lives in his own salvage yard called "Tow Mater - Towing & Salvage" and is the first car to befriend and support Lightning McQueen during his stay in Radiator Springs. In the film, Mater bonds with Lightning and teaches him how to play "tractor tipping". After tractor tipping, Lightning tells Mater about the Piston Cup Championship and the benefits he would receive in racing for Dinoco. When Lightning agrees to let Mater fly in a helicopter if he wins the tiebreaker race, Mater states that he knew he made a good choice in choosing Lightning as his best-friend.

During the tiebreaker race, Lightning drives backwards to counter Chick Hicks' dirty driving, a move which Mater taught him earlier. After the race, Mater can be seen riding in a Dinoco helicopter above Radiator Springs like Lightning promised him.

Cars 2

Mater's friendship with McQueen has grown stronger over time, with a lengthy best-friend handshake to prove it. In an attempt to defend McQueen against racing rival Francesco Bernoulli, Mater inadvertently gets McQueen to race in the World Grand Prix. McQueen in turn invites Mater to join him, and they set out from Radiator Springs to Tokyo for the first race. Mater is soon mistaken for an American spy by British Agent Holley Shiftwell. Mater is mesmerized by her beauty and falls for her immediately. 

During the first race, while evading capture, Mater accidentally causes a miscommunication that costs McQueen the win, resulting in McQueen lashing out at Mater and telling him that he doesn't need or want his help any more. Feeling dejected, Mater decides to return home, only to be taken back into the spy mission by Shiftwell's partner Finn McMissile. Mater ultimately solves the mystery of the Grand Prix during the third and final race in London, and is granted an honorary knighthood. At the end of the film, he decides to compete in the unofficial Radiator Springs Grand Prix with McQueen after retaining a pair of rocket jets, part of the weapons arsenal he acquired from McMissile and Shiftwell.

Cars 3

Mater remains McQueen's best friend and supporter, never missing any races to proudly show support, going as far as wearing over-the-top wearable merchandises. He is also there with Sally to comfort McQueen after he crashes, and is among the rest of the Radiator Springs residents to witness McQueen make the decision to continue racing. Mater decides to stay with the other cars in Radiator Springs while McQueen heads to the Rust-eze Training Center in Florida to prepare for the Florida 500, and asks McQueen to call him after he has arrived there.

Later in the film McQueen video calls Mater, and they both have a heart-to-heart conversation. McQueen asks Mater for help after seeing that nextgen racer Jackson Storm has set a new speed record. In response, Mater helps McQueen remember Doc Hudson's mentor and crew chief Smokey, and he decides to locate him and ask him for advice. During the Florida 500, Mater becomes aware of Sterling's selfish plans and buys McQueen some time by distracting Sterling, allowing McQueen to get Cruz Ramirez to replace him during the race. Mater later returns with everyone to Radiator Springs, and is there when McQueen reveals that he would continue racing but first spend the rest of the season as Cruz's crew chief. In a post-credits scene, Mater is seen singing in his junkyard. He receives a call but accidentally knocks his stand over.

Mater and the Ghostlight

The short film follows Mater's day-to-day activities after things have returned to normal in Radiator Springs. Mater likes to play scary pranks on other characters until a blue light begins haunting him. His final prank is his most successful: Lightning McQueen sees a tow hook hanging from behind a stack of cans and, assuming that Mater is hiding behind it, approaches to foil the prank. Mater then jumps off of the roof of Flo's café, screaming behind McQueen, who then is startled and knocks over the pile of cans, revealing that the hook was actually from the sign of Mater's place of business, thus a decoy. Everyone starts to laugh at McQueen for having fallen for this clever trick, and Mater teases, "Whoa, Buddy. You look like you seen ... the Ghostlight!"

Sheriff admonishes him for "mocking the Ghostlight," a character of urban legend amongst the cars. The Ghostlight is described as a "glowing orb of blue, translucent light" that haunts Radiator Springs, and hates nothing more than the sound of clanking metal – a sound frequently made by Mater's rickety shell. Sheriff continues to tell the story of a young couple lost in the area, whose only remains were "two out-of-state license plates." He then concludes with an overly cheerful "Well, g'night." The population of Radiator Springs then leaves within seconds, leaving a very nervous Mater by himself.

As he reaches his garage he is first frightened by a "lightning bug" (a tiny flying Volkswagen Beetle with bright headlights). As he relaxes, a bright blue glow suddenly appears behind him and he goes into a blind panic, driving around in a frenzy, first going along the main road, then going through the tractor field, past Frank, then around Willy's Butte, and doing a lock-strafe move after that, until he is exhausted. The Ghostlight however, is just a glowing blue lantern to Mater's towing cable hung up by McQueen and Guido.

The short ends with Mater finally collapsing on the road before finally realizing that it's just a blue lantern. It was then the rest of the folks surround him and laugh at him, revealing the joke as retribution for the pranks he did to them (with his best friend Lightning laughing the loudest and throwing in a "Gotcha!"). The credits roll and after them there is a closing shot where the frightened Mater finds he has a huge construction vehicle behind him, snarling and carrying the license plate "Banshee." Mater does not realize who it is though and warns it of the Screaming Banshee before driving off, bidding the confused Banshee good night.

Cars Toons: Mater's Tall Tales

Mater returns as the main character in Cars Toon: Mater's Tall Tales with Larry the Cable Guy reprising the role. Each tale begins with Mater telling a far-fetched story of his past. In the story, Mater finds himself in an inescapable predicament. When McQueen questions Mater over whether the events in the story actually occurred, Mater responds, "Don't you remember? You was there too!", and continues the story including McQueen's sudden participation. The short series end with Mater leaving the conversation, often followed by characters or references to the story that was being told, putting up a possibility that the story might have been real.

Cars on the Road 

In the off-season after the events of Cars 3, Mater reveals that he has an older sister, whose name is later revealed to be Mato, living in the eastern United States, much to the awe of McQueen and the other residents of Radiator Springs. Furthermore, he spontaneously announces his decision to drive across the country to attend her wedding. Mater laments that he has not seen Mato in ages and is not looking forward to the trip. To make Mater feel better, McQueen offers to with and make it a road trip; Mater happily accepts. During the trip, Mater is often more open to meeting new cars and trying new things than McQueen, which tends to lead to something unexpected and uncomfortable for McQueen.

When Mater and McQueen finally arrive, McQueen tells Mater he looks forward to relaxing on a plane for the trip back home, much to Mater's disappointment, who had actually enjoyed the turbulent ride. They go to Mater's childhood house, where the wedding is held; the enormous size of the house and obvious wealthy upbringing shocks McQueen. Cruz Ramirez is also at the wedding; her cousin, Mateo, is the groom, meaning Mater and Ramirez will become family. Mater and Mato finally see each other; their appearances and personalities sharply contrast from one another. Mato prods Mater on and reveals their competitive rivalry over who is better. They initiate several competitions with one another, delaying the wedding. With help from Cruz, Mater and Mato are able to work out their differences, and the wedding proceeds. At the dinner, Mater gives a toast, in which he reveals he wishes to spend more time with; this inspires McQueen to reconsider taking the road back home with Mater. The series ends with Mater and McQueen beginning the drive back to Radiator Springs.

Video games

Mater appears in all Cars video games with Larry the Cable Guy reprising his role in all video games to date (with the exception of Cars 3: Driven to Win). In the video game Cars, Mater is a playable character in the Arcade Mode, "Tractor Tipping", and "Rustbucket Race-O-Rama" levels. He does commentary for the race in "Radiator Springs Grand Prix" and "Radiator Springs GP". He teaches McQueen how to drive backwards in "Mater's Backwards Lesson". Mater is a playable character in both the Story and Arcade Modes of Cars Mater-National Championship. The Cars Race-O-Rama video game introduces new rivals to Mater: Bubba, Tater and Tater Jr., all of them tow trucks, who challenge Mater to a race for the towing rights to Radiator Springs. However, Tater and Tater Jr. later befriend Mater. Mater also makes an appearance as a playable character in Cars 2: the Video Game as well as Disney Infinity.

In popular culture
 In 2006, Hollywood automotive body customiser Eddie Paul created Lightning, Sally, and Mater as the real-life vehicles brought by Mack on a 41-city Cars promotional tour.
 Real life replicas of Mater and Lightning McQueen are shown at Disney California Adventure Park at Disneyland Resort in Anaheim, CA and Disney's Hollywood Studios and Epcot (as plants due to the sequel, Cars 2) of Walt Disney World in Lake Buena Vista, FL. In addition, unofficial replicas have been created by fans of the movie.

References

External links

 

Cars (franchise) characters
Film sidekicks
U.S. Route 66 in Kansas
Film characters introduced in 2006
Male characters in film
Fictional characters from Arizona
Fictional characters with speech impediment
Fictional secret agents and spies
Fictional racing drivers
Animated characters introduced in 2006